Until 1 January 2007 Munkebo municipality was a municipality (Danish, kommune) in former Funen County on the northeast coast of the island of Funen in central Denmark.  The municipality covered an area of 19 km2, and had a total population of 5,720 (2005).  Its last mayor was Palle Hansborg-Sørensen, a member of the Social Democrats (Denmark) (Socialdemokraterne) political party. The main city and the site of its municipal council was the town of Munkebo.

Munkebo municipality ceased to exist as the result of Kommunalreformen ("The Municipality Reform" of 2007).  It was merged with Kerteminde and Langeskov municipalities to form an enlarged Kerteminde municipality.  This created a municipality with an area of 203 km2 and a total population of 23,071 (2005).  The municipality belongs to the new Region of Southern Denmark.

External links 
 Kerteminde municipality's official website ( only)

References 
 Municipal statistics: NetBorger Kommunefakta, delivered from KMD aka Kommunedata (Municipal Data)
 Municipal mergers and neighbors: Eniro new municipalities map

Former municipalities of Denmark